Egg Island is a circular island  in diameter and 310 m high, lying  west of Tail Island in the northeast part of Prince Gustav Channel. Probably first seen by a party under J. Gunnar Andersson of the Swedish Antarctic Expedition, 1901–04. Egg Island was charted in 1945 by the Falkland Islands Dependencies Survey (FIDS), who so named it because of its relative position to Tail, Eagle and Beak Islands.

See also
 Composite Antarctic Gazetteer
 List of Antarctic and sub-Antarctic islands
 List of Antarctic islands south of 60° S

References

Islands of Trinity Peninsula